Rab3 GTPase-activating protein catalytic subunit is an enzyme that in humans is encoded by the RAB3GAP1 gene.

Function 
Members of the RAB3 protein family (see RAB3A; MIM 179490) are implicated in regulated exocytosis of neurotransmitters and hormones. RAB3GAP, which is involved in regulation of RAB3 activity, is a heterodimeric complex consisting a 130-kD catalytic subunit and a 150-kD noncatalytic subunit (MIM 609275). RAB3GAP specifically converts active RAB3-GTP to the inactive form RAB3-GDP (Aligianis et al., 2005).[supplied by OMIM] RAB3GAP is reported to modulate basal and rapamycin-induced autophagy in human fibroblasts and C. elegans. Further, the RAB3GAP1 knockdown has shown to affect the autophagy and mineralization potential of human primary osteoblasts.

See also 
 Warburg Micro syndrome
 RAB3GAP2 - the 150-kD noncatalytic subunit of RAB3GAP complex
 Tbc domain

References

Further reading